Our Lady Seat of Wisdom College (SWISCOL) is a secondary school located in Fontem, Cameroon.

History 
It is a coeducational boarding school founded by Chiara Lubich and Fon Fontem Defang in 1966. Today it has an enrolment of 600+ students.

Administration

Principals 
 Reverend Father George F. Cunningham *Reverend Father Stumpel.
 Anne Bustarret.
 Jane Dubé (1988-2001)
 Nelson Vieira Porto Alegre
 Reverend Father Darryl Joseph D’Souza.
 Raphael Takougang
 Clelia Ferrini
Marelen Nkafu

Vice principals 
 Nelson Vieira Porto Alegre
 Clelia Ferrini
Marelen Nkafu

Dormitories 
Since SWISCOL is a coeducational boarding school, it has both female and male dormitories. There are four of each.

Female dormitories 
 Bernadette
 Fátima
 Immaculate
 New Wing

Male dormitories 
 Chiara (named for Chiara Lubich)
 Cunningham
 Defang (named for Fon Fontem Defang)
 Julius Peters (named for Julius Joseph Willem Peeters, M.H.M former bishop of Buéa)

See also 

 Education in Cameroon

References

External links 
 Our Lady Seat of Wisdom College Online Community

1966 establishments in Cameroon
Boarding schools in the South West Region
Co-educational boarding schools
Educational institutions established in 1966
Catholic boarding schools
Catholic secondary schools in Africa
Secondary schools in Cameroon